Ivana Grubor (Serbian Cyrillic: Ивана Грубор, born June 28, 1984, in Novi Sad, SFR Yugoslavia) is a former Serbian female basketball player.

External links
Profile at eurobasket.com

1984 births
Living people
Basketball players from Novi Sad
Serbian women's basketball players
Power forwards (basketball)
ŽKK Crvena zvezda players
ŽKK Radivoj Korać players
ŽKK Vojvodina players